The Drava or Drave is a river in southern Central Europe. Its source is near the market town of Innichen/San Candido, in the Puster Valley of South Tyrol/Alto Adige, Italy. The river flows eastwards through East Tirol and Carinthia in Austria into the Styria region of Slovenia. It then turns southeast, passing through Croatia and, after merging with its main tributary Mur, forms most of the border between Croatia and Hungary, before it joins the Danube near Osijek.

Name
In ancient times the river was known as Dravus or Draus in Latin, and in Greek as Δράος and Δράβος. Medieval attestations of the name include Dravis ( AD 670), Drauva (in 799), Drauus (in 811), Trauum (in 1091), and Trah (in 1136). The name is pre-Roman and pre-Celtic, but probably of Indo-European origin, from the root *dreu̯- 'flow'. The river gives its name to the dravite species of tourmaline.

Geography
The Drava (along with one of its tributaries, the Slizza) and the Spöl are the only two rivers originating in Italy that belong to the Danube drainage basin. Its main right  tributaries (from the south) are the Gail (45 m³/s) in Austria, the Meža (12 m³/s) and Dravinja (11 m³/s) in Slovenia, and the Bednja (? m³/s) in Croatia.

Mean discharge is for the last station in the country mentioned in the source.

Course

The Drava sources are located at the drainage divide between the market town of Innichen/San Candido and neighbouring Toblach/Dobbiaco in the west, where the Rienz River rises, a tributary of the Adige/Etsch. At Innichen itself the 16+ km , originating near the Sextener Rotwand, joins the ~2 km long source creek. The river than flows eastwards and after 8 kilometres crosses into East Tyrol in Austria. At Lienz it flows into the Isel, sourced from the glaciers of the Venediger and Glockner Groups. The Isel (average discharge 39 m³/s) is almost three times larger than the Drava (14 m³/s) where they meet and, starting from the source of its tributary  under the Rötspitze, the Isel (ca. 64 km) is also longer than the combined Drava and Sextner Bach (ca. 60 km) to that point.

The river then flows east into Carinthia at Oberdrauburg. The river separates the Kreuzeck range of the High Tauern in the north and the Gailtal Alps in the south, passes the Sachsenburg narrows and the site of the ancient city of Teurnia, before it reaches the town of Spittal an der Drau. Downstream of Villach, it runs along the northern slopes of the Karawanks to Ferlach and Lavamünd.

The Drava passes into Slovenia at Gorče near Dravograd, from where it runs for  via Vuzenica, Muta, Ruše, and Maribor to Ptuj and the border with Croatia at Ormož. The river then passes Varaždin, Belišće and Osijek in Croatia, and Barcs in Hungary.

The hydrological parameters of Drava are regularly monitored in Croatia at Botovo, Terezino Polje, Donji Miholjac and Osijek.

Hydroelectric power plants 
Currently, there are 22 hydroelectric power plants on the Drava. The power plants are listed beginning at the headwaters:

The Drava River is one of the most exploited rivers in the world in terms of hydropower, with almost 100% of its water potential energy being exploited. As the region of the river is a place of exceptional biodiversity, this raises several ecological concerns, together with other forms of exploitation such as use of river deposits.

References

Bibliography

External links 

 DrauDrava - old river and new sounds
 Condition of Drava in various locations in Slovenia: 
 Črneče  - graphs, in the following order, of water level, flow and temperature data for the past 30 days (taken in Črneče by ARSO)
 Ptuj  - graphs, in the following order, of water level, flow and temperature data for the past 30 days (taken in Ptuj by ARSO)
 Borl  - graphs, in the following order, of water level, flow and temperature data for the past 30 days (taken in Borl by ARSO)

 
 
Rivers of Croatia
Border rivers
Rivers of Styria (Slovenia)
Rivers of Hungary
Rivers of Italy
Rivers of South Tyrol
Rivers of Tyrol (state)
Rivers of Carinthia (state)
Tributaries of the Danube
International rivers of Europe
Croatia–Hungary border
Croatia–Slovenia border
Austria–Slovenia border
Natura 2000 in Slovenia
Rivers of Austria